Natangwe Peuya Onyika Petrus (born 15 May 2000) is a Namibian international footballer who plays as a midfielder for Okahandja United.

Career statistics

International

References

Living people
Namibian men's footballers
Namibia international footballers
Association football midfielders
2000 births